Orzeszkowo may refer to the following places:
Orzeszkowo, Międzychód County in Greater Poland Voivodeship (west-central Poland)
Orzeszkowo, Środa Wielkopolska County in Greater Poland Voivodeship (west-central Poland)
Orzeszkowo, Podlaskie Voivodeship (north-east Poland)
Orzeszkowo, West Pomeranian Voivodeship (north-west Poland)